Luis Armando Eyzaguirre Silva (born 22 June 1939), also known as Fifo, is a former Chilean football player. He played right back in the Universidad de Chile football team known as the Ballet Azul, with which he won five national championships.

He played in 1959 Copa América and in the FIFA World Cup he achieved third place with the Chilean national selection for the 1962 FIFA World Cup and was one of the players involved in the Battle of Santiago incident during the Group 2 match between Chile and Italy. He played one match in the 1966 FIFA World Cup. He was considered one of the best right back of his time, next to the Brazilian Djalma Santos. He played 39 matches for his country between 1959 and 1966. He was one of the players invited by FIFA to play in a commemorative game celebrating the centennial anniversary of football.

Honors

 Chilean League: (5)
 1959, 1962, 1964, 1965, 1967

References

1939 births
Living people
Footballers from Santiago
Chilean footballers
Chile international footballers
Chilean people of Basque descent
Universidad de Chile footballers
C.D. Huachipato footballers
Ferroviarios footballers
Chilean Primera División players
1962 FIFA World Cup players
1966 FIFA World Cup players
Association football fullbacks